Hollywood Party, also known under its working title of Hollywood Revue of 1933 and Star Spangled Banquet, is a 1934 American pre-Code musical film starring Laurel and Hardy, The Three Stooges, Jimmy Durante, Lupe Vélez and Mickey Mouse (voiced by an uncredited Walt Disney). It was distributed by Metro-Goldwyn-Mayer. Each sequence featured a different star with a separate scriptwriter and director assigned.

Plot 

Jungle movie star "Schnarzan" (Jimmy Durante), a character in parody of Tarzan, is advised by his manager that he needs new lions for his pictures, as his old ones are "worn out". At a wild Hollywood party with many varied guests, including a "lion provider", hilarity ensues. After it all gets out of hand, Schnarzan awakens to find he is just plain old Durante, who had a strange dream.

Cast

Live action cast
 Stan Laurel as Stan
 Oliver Hardy as Ollie
 Jimmy Durante as Durante/Schnarzan
 Jack Pearl as Baron Munchausen
 Polly Moran as Henrietta Clemp
 Charles Butterworth as Harvey Clemp
 Eddie Quillan as Bob Benson
 June Clyde as Linda Clemp
 Lupe Vélez as The Jaguar Woman/Jane in Schnarzan Sequence
 George Givot as Liondora, aka Grand Royal Duke
 Richard Carle as Knapp
Uncredited cast
 Ted Healy as Reporter
 The Three Stooges as themselves 
 Jeanne Olsen as Mrs. Jimmy Durante [previously married to Durante]
 Tom London as Paul Revere 
 Edwin Maxwell as Producer Buddy Goldfish 
 Arthur Treacher as Durante's Butler 
 Beatrice Hagen as Show Girl And Party Guest
 Bess Flowers as Party Guest
 Robert Young as Radio Announcer

Voice cast
 Walt Disney as Mickey Mouse (uncredited)

Production background 
During production the movie was known as Star Spangled Banquet and the Hollywood Revue of 1933. Although Hollywood Party has no director credited, it has been asserted that Allan Dwan, Edmund Goulding, Russell Mack, Charles Reisner, Roy Rowland and Sam Wood directed various scenes with the overwhelming majority directed by Richard Boleslavsky. George Stevens directed the Laurel and Hardy sequence and Dave Gould directed the "Feelin' High" dance number with choreography by Georgie Hale. Seymour Felix and Eddie Prinz directed final reshoots. Around the Metro-Goldwyn-Mayer backlot, the choreographers of the dance sequences were competing with those staging the MGM movie Dancing Lady, vying to see who could create the most elaborate dance number.

The movie had many sequences cut or reshot after several references proved too esoteric for foreign audiences. A sequence that had featured Thelma Todd (impersonating Mae West), Lupe Vélez, Jimmy Durante and Zasu Pitts playing bridge was deleted after it was lost on British viewers not yet familiar with the game. Additional episodes that featured actors Herman Bing, Johnny Weissmuller, Jackie Cooper and Max Baer were cut from the movie. As a result, surviving prints run approximately 68 minutes, but the original run time was 75 minutes. Famed songwriters Rodgers and Hart contributed most of the music. Gus Kahn wrote "Moonlight Serenade" for the 1933 Busby Berkeley movie Footlight Parade. However, when that song was cut from the Warner Bros. picture, it was placed a year later in Hollywood Party and sung by Eddie Quillan.

The movie was neither a financial nor critical success. It was considered too avant garde to appeal to general audiences. It remains significant today for its 31 stars, including Laurel and Hardy, radio celebrity Jack Pearl, The Three Stooges (in their final appearance for MGM), and Mickey Mouse. The Three Stooges routine was written by Arthur Kober. The Mickey Mouse sequence introduces a Technicolor cartoon, The Hot Choc-late Soldiers, created by Walt Disney with music by Nacio Herb Brown, and lyrics by Arthur Freed.

Reception 
Critical reception for Hollywood Party upon its original release was largely negative. Multiple exhibitors wrote in to the Motion Picture Herald to express their disgust with the movie, and one theater manager from Kentucky called it "One of the poorest excuses for a picture we have ever played". The New York Times wrote that it "may have been very funny while it was being made, but as it comes to the screen it is not a little disappointing".

See also 
 Laurel and Hardy films
 Three Stooges Filmography

References

External links 
 Hollywood Party at the Internet Movie Database
 
 
 
 
 

1933 films
1933 musical comedy films
1930s color films
American films with live action and animation
American musical comedy films
Mickey Mouse films
The Three Stooges films
Metro-Goldwyn-Mayer films
Films directed by Roy Rowland
Films produced by Harry Rapf
American black-and-white films
Early color films
1930s English-language films
1930s American films